The New Royalist Action (NAR) is a monarchist (Orléanist) political movement desiring to create a constitutional monarchy in France.

History
The movement has its roots in Action Française, the major French monarchist movement before World War II, which was re-formed by Maurice Pujo in 1947 around the movement Restoration Nationale. In 1971 a breakaway movement, the Nouvelle Action Française was established by Bertrand Renouvin. Soon, the name of this movement was changed to Nouvelle Action Royaliste; Renouvin, arguably "France's most prominent [...] and reasonable monarchist″ is the group's president. The NAR publish in particular a historical review entitled Le Lys rouge and a political semi-monthly Royaliste.

Ideology
The members of the NAR are sometimes described as "royalists of the left", due to close relations to certain ideas defended by the parties of the left. Its leader, Bertrand Renouvin, appealed to his supporters to vote for Socialist François Mitterrand in both the 1981 and 1988 presidential elections. In November 1989, the NAR joined the 89 pour l'égalité movement, which campaigned to get voting rights for immigrants alongside SOS Racisme. At the time of the 2002 presidential elections, Renouvin chose to support the candidature of Jean-Pierre Chevènement, the only souverainist able in Renouvin's view to gather the good will of both left and right for the purpose of regaining France her position in the world.

The ideas of NAR are characterized by souverainism, anti-liberalism and anti-Americanism. They are economically Keynesian. The NAR appealed to vote against the European Constitution in the referendum of 29 May 2005.

The organization is member of the International Monarchist Conference.

Electoral results

Presidential

References

External links
Official site 

Monarchist parties in France
French Integralism
Action Française